The fifth Annual American Music Awards were held on January 16, 1978.

Winners and nominees

References
 http://theenvelope.latimes.com/extras/lostmind/year/1978/1978ama.htm

1978